Marchenoir is a commune in the Loir-et-Cher department of central France. The nearby forest of Marchenoir was the site of L'Aumône Abbey, a Cistercian daughter house of Cîteaux Abbey. The Earl of Buckingham stayed at the Abbey in 1380 whilst his army was quartered in the Forest.

History
In 1650 Claude Pajon was appointed to be pastor to the Reformed Church at Marchenoir.

 The husband and wife comedians Raymond Bussières and Annette Poivre are buried in the Marchenoir cemetery.

Population

See also
Communes of the Loir-et-Cher department

References

Communes of Loir-et-Cher